Jay Evan Jackson, known professionally as Laganja Estranja (born December 28, 1988) is an American choreographer and drag queen based in Los Angeles. Laganja competed on the sixth season of RuPaul's Drag Race, finishing in eighth place. She came out as transgender in 2021.

Early life
Jackson was born to Nancy Lynn Ferrin Jackson and David Michael Jackson, was raised in Dallas, Texas, and attended the Booker T. Washington High School for the Performing and Visual Arts. Both of her parents worked as high school guidance counselors for over 30 years. She obtained a BFA in dance from the California Institute of the Arts.

Career

Drag
Laganja Estranja's drag debut was at Micky's West Hollywood on November 7, 2011. After winning the Amateur Competition, Laganja became an official "Showgirl" with a monthly gig at Micky's. Laganja went on to win "Queen of Queens" at 340 Nightclub in Pomona, CA and "Best Newcomer" in West Hollywood.

In April 2013, Laganja Estranja auditioned for RuPaul's Drag Race. She was accepted in the show, and filmed in the summer of 2013. In 2014, the sixth season of drag-oriented reality competition RuPaul's Drag Race aired on LogoTV. Laganja performed moderately well on the show, winning a challenge when she was partnered with the eventual runner-up, Adore Delano. Laganja was eliminated in the eighth episode of the season, placing her in a small category of contestants in the show's history who were eliminated the week after winning a challenge. At the outset of the show, Laganja received quite a lot of attention on social media for her entrance. During the show, Laganja became infamous for her over-the-top dramatics, catchphrases, and emotional breakdowns. Eventual winner Bianca Del Rio credited Laganja as the root of every memorable quote from the following season of RuPaul's Drag Race. Laganja's mannerisms have since been parodied by fellow drag queens, including Alaska Thunderfuck.

Laganja Estranja is the drag daughter of Alyssa Edwards, and the drag sister of Shangela and Plastique Tiara —all of whom competed on RuPaul's Drag Race, Edwards appearing on season 5 and season 2 of RuPaul's Drag Race: All Stars, Shangela appearing on season 2 and 3 and All Stars season 3, and Tiara on season 11. Under the moniker of the Haus of Edwards, they have internationally toured and performed together on multiple occasions, most notably at the pre-show warm-up for the finale episode of the seventh season of RuPaul's Drag Race. Laganja currently hosts her own web show on the drag-centric platform World of Wonder, the same production company behind RuPaul's Drag Race, RuPaul's DragCon LA, and RuPaul's DragCon NYC.

Laganja appeared as a Lip-Sync Assassin in the third episode of RuPaul's Drag Race All Stars Season 6, winning the lip-sync against fellow season 6 contestant, Trinity K. Bonet. She was a featured performer during Jennifer Lopez's performance at the 2022 iHeartRadio Music Awards.

Music
In 2014, Laganja contributed vocals to a cover of RuPaul's "Jealous of My Boogie", for the album RuPaul Presents: The CoverGurlz. Throughout 2014, Laganja was featured on three singles, contributing a rap verse to each song. In 2015, she released her debut single as a lead artist, titled "Legs", which featured American rapper Rye Rye. In June 2015, "Legs" was rated as the third best song by a RuPaul's Drag Race contestant by Pitchfork Media. In June 2015, Laganja was featured on fellow RuPaul's Drag Race star, Alaska Thunderfuck's debut album, Anus, on the track "Gimme All Your Money".

In 2016, she released both her third single "Tease 4U" and a Christmas Album with the Haus of Edwards.  Her single on the album is entitled "Green XXXmas," and the video featured exotic dancer Candace Cane. In September 2018, she released her fourth single "Look At Me" featuring J. Tyler, and an accompanying video. The video took a stance against arrests for marijuana possession. In November 2018, she released a lyric video for her fifth single "Smoke Break".

Cannabis advocacy 
As a cannabis rights activist, Laganja has hosted conversations on cannabis legalization at Trinity College in Dublin, Ireland, and at Impulse in San Francisco. She has also been featured twice in High Times Magazine as well as on the cover of Dope Magazine, making her the first LGBTQ+ advocate on the cover of a cannabis magazine. In 2014, Laganja launched a collection of marijuana-themed merchandise including a jewelry line named Laganja Estranja Is My Enemy. Laganja has also collaborated with Blunted Objects on a marijuana-themed statement necklace.

In September 2018, Laganja was interviewed by Civilized Magazine about her music video for Look at Me that “slammed” the war on drugs. The interview by Civilized — a magazine reported to be for the millions of adults who choose to enjoy cannabis recreationally — covered a number of aspects behind the imagery of Laganja's music video. Leafly, the world's largest cannabis information site, featured Laganja on its in-house podcast in January 2019. The podcast, The Hash, explored, alongside Laganja, topics like homophobia in the cannabis industry and what it's like to often be the only queer person in a room.

The Laganja Estranja lifestyle brand includes a collaboration preroll joint with San Francisco's The Hepburns, called "LAhepburns." Laganja also partnered with FRUIT SLABS, a company making cannabis infused, vegan, real-fruit squares for their 2019 PRIDE collection. Laganja worked with FRUIT SLABS to create a one-of-a-kind flavor to be offered for a limited time.

Dance 
Graduating from The California Institute of the Arts in 2011 with a bachelor of fine arts degree in dance and choreography, Laganja is a skilled choreographer, teacher, and dancer. A Presidential Scholar in The Arts, Laganja performed her original work “not today” at the Kennedy Center in 2007. Laganja is also a YoungArts Silver Winner and returns every year to the program to mentor high school students in Miami, Florida. Laganja's choreography credits include Germany's Next Top Model, NYC Cosmetics FACE Awards, and for commercial artists such as Miley Cyrus and Brooke Candy.

In mid-2017, Laganja led a dance theatre project on gender expression with artists across Europe assembling in Nottingham, UK for a four-day workshop and showcase exploring the boundaries of gender identity. “G[END]ER” was in collaboration with Backlit Gallery, Kitty Tray, and Nottingham Contemporary. In the fall of 2018, Laganja elaborated on this idea of gender expression with her dance residency at YoungArts. The immersive experience included live vocals, original compositions, and curated set design. In late-2018, Laganja was partnered with the Pérez Art Museum Miami (Pamm) to present the art of drag for a one-day Poplife Social YoungArts Takeover. The event at the world-renowned art museum included an invitation from Laganja herself, “Onto Pamm’s terrace to warm up their dance muscles, ‘sissy that walk’ across the space and participate in a fan dance inspired by traditional Japanese performance.”

In 2016, Laganja's Dance School, an international high-heels masterclass and confidence workshop, was founded with partner Kristen Lovell. The master class has been held in dozens of cities in the United States and as an international experience, has traveled to Manchester, Nottingham, London, Newcastle, Dublin, Lima, Mexico City, and Amsterdam. In 2019, the documentary Laganja's Dance School was released. The documentary was directed by Selene Kapsaski and chronicles Laganja Estranja teaching a dance class in London.

Personal life
Laganja spoke out against Donald Trump while the latter was running for president of the United States. In 2021, she came out as a transgender woman.

Discography

Singles

As lead artist

As featured artist

Guest appearances

Filmography

Film

Television

Music videos

Music video appearances

Web series

References

External links

 

1988 births
Living people
21st-century American dancers
21st-century American singers
American cannabis activists
American dancers
American drag queens
American LGBT singers
American rappers
California Institute of the Arts alumni
Dancers from Texas
LGBT dancers
LGBT people from Texas
People from Dallas
Rappers from Texas
RuPaul's Drag Race contestants
Television personalities from Texas
Transgender drag performers
Transgender women